Sérgio Júnior may refer to:

 Sérgio Júnior (footballer) (born 1979), born (1979), Brazilian footballer
 Sergio Junior (gymnast) (born 1992), Brazilian gymnast

See also
 Sergio Benvindo Junior (born 1989), Swedish contemporary dancer
 Sérgio Dutra Júnior (born 1988), Brazilian footballer
 Sérgio Manoel Júnior (born 1972), Brazilian footballer